Tae-hee is a Korean unisex given name.

The meaning of the name depends on the hanja chosen. There are 20 hanja with the reading "tae" and 25 hanja with the reading "hee" on the South Korean government's official list of hanja which may be used in given names. For example:
: the first character means "big" or "great", while the second means "joy", expressing a wish by the parents that the child will grow up strong, healthy, and happy

People with this name include:
Nam Tae-Hi (1929–2013), South Korean taekwondo master
Yim Tae-hee (born 1956), South Korean politician, former chief of staff to Lee Myung-bak
Kim Tae-hee (born 1980), South Korean actress
Nam Tae-hee (born 1991), South Korean international footballer
Lee Tae-hee (born 1992), South Korean football defender (K-League Classic)
Lee Tae-hee (footballer, born 1995), South Korean football goalkeeper (K-League Classic)

See also
List of Korean given names

References

Korean unisex given names